Skopos is a village in Greece.

Skopos may also refer to:

Skopos theory, a translation studies concept
Skopo, Sežana, a village in Slovenia

See also
Scopus (disambiguation)